Pilosocereus (from Latin, "hairy cereus") is a genus of cactus native to the Neotropics. Tree cactus is a common name for Pilosocereus species.

The commonly cultivated Pilosocereus pachycladus (syn. Pilosocereus azureus) is a blue cactus with hairy areoles that emit golden spines.

Synonymy
The genera Pilocereus K.Schum. and Pseudopilocereus Buxb. are synonyms of this genus.

Species
Species as of 2021:
 Pilosocereus albisummus 
 Pilosocereus alensis 
 Pilosocereus armatus 
 Pilosocereus arrabidae 
 Pilosocereus aureispinus 
 Pilosocereus aurilanatus 
 Pilosocereus aurisetus 
 Pilosocereus azulensis 
 Pilosocereus bohlei 
 Pilosocereus brasiliensis 
 Pilosocereus brasiliensis subsp. brasiliensis
 Pilosocereus brasiliensis subsp. ruschianus 
 Pilosocereus brooksianus 
 Pilosocereus catingicola 
 Pilosocereus catingicola subsp. catingicola
 Pilosocereus catingicola subsp. salvadorensis 
 Pilosocereus chrysacanthus 
 Pilosocereus chrysostele 
 Pilosocereus chrysostele subsp. catimbauensis 
 Pilosocereus chrysostele subsp. chrysostele
 Pilosocereus collinsii 
 Pilosocereus colombianus 
 Pilosocereus curtisii 
 Pilosocereus densiareolatus 
 Pilosocereus diersianus 
 Pilosocereus flavipulvinatus 
 Pilosocereus flexibilispinus 
 Pilosocereus floccosus 
 Pilosocereus floccosus subsp. floccosus
 Pilosocereus floccosus subsp. quadricostatus 
 Pilosocereus fulvilanatus 
 Pilosocereus fulvilanatus subsp. fulvilanatus
 Pilosocereus fulvilanatus subsp. rosae 
 Pilosocereus gaumeri 
 Pilosocereus glaucochrous 
 Pilosocereus jamaicensis 
 Pilosocereus juaruensis subsp. juaruensis
 Pilosocereus juaruensis subsp. cincinnopetalus 
 Pilosocereus kanukuensis 
 Pilosocereus lanuginosus 
 Pilosocereus leucocephalus 
 Pilosocereus machrisii 
 Pilosocereus magnificus 
 Pilosocereus millspaughii 
 Pilosocereus mollispinus 
 Pilosocereus moritzianus 
 Pilosocereus multicostatus 
 Pilosocereus oligolepis 
 Pilosocereus pachycladus 
 Pilosocereus pachycladus subsp. pachycladus
 Pilosocereus pachycladus subsp. pernambucoensis 
 Pilosocereus pachycladus subsp. viridis 
 Pilosocereus parvus 
 Pilosocereus pentaedrophorus 
 Pilosocereus piauhyensis 
 Pilosocereus polygonus 
 Pilosocereus purpusii 
 Pilosocereus pusillibaccatus 
 Pilosocereus quadricentralis 
 Pilosocereus robinii 
 Pilosocereus splendidus 
 Pilosocereus ×subsimilis 
 Pilosocereus tillianus 
 Pilosocereus ulei 
 Pilosocereus vilaboensis 
 Pilosocereus vilaboensis subsp. pluricostatus 
 Pilosocereus vilaboensis subsp. rizzoanus 
 Pilosocereus vilaboensis subsp. vilaboensis
 Pilosocereus zappiae

References

External links

 
Cacti of North America
Cacti of South America
Cactoideae genera
Neotropical realm flora